Bill Thurman (November 4, 1920 – April 13, 1995) was an American film and television actor. From the early 1960s until his death in 1995, he frequently appeared in B movies and independent films, often playing "redneck types" or sheriffs. He worked with low-budget-director Larry Buchanan on numerous films, for example In the Year 2889 and It's Alive!. Thurman was one of those Southern actors who specialized in "regional" pictures, films made exclusively for distribution in the Southern States.

However, Thurman also appeared in two movies by Hollywood star director Steven Spielberg and played Coach Popper, the apparently homosexual husband of Cloris Leachman, in Peter Bogdanovich's The Last Picture Show (1971). The character actor also appeared in popular television shows like Dallas and Centennial. One of his later roles was Reverend McWiley in the horror film Mountaintop Motel Massacre (1983).

Selected filmography

 The Yesterday Machine (1963) - Police detective
 The Trial of Lee Harvey Oswald (1964) - Witness
 High Yellow (1965) - Major Bates
 Hot Blooded Woman (1965) - Railroad Tough
 The Black Cat (1966) - Bartender
 Zontar, the Thing from Venus (1966, TV Movie) - Sheriff Brad Crenshaw
 Curse of the Swamp Creature (1966, TV Movie) - Driscoll West / The Swamp Creature
 Spiked Heels and Black Nylons (1967) - Abel
 In the Year 2889 (1967) - Lt. Lang
 Shameless Desire (1967) - Cal
 Night Fright (1967) - Deputy Ben Whitfield
 Sam (1967)
 The Other Side of Bonnie and Clyde (1968) - Policeman (uncredited)
 It's Alive! (1969, TV Movie) - Greely / Monster
 A Bullet for Pretty Boy (1970) - Huddy
 The Last Picture Show (1971) - Coach Popper
 Encounter with the Unknown (1973) - Second Man
 The Sugarland Express (1974) - Hunter
 Ride in a Pink Car (1974) - Barlow
 'Gator Bait (1974) - Sheriff Joe Bob Thomas
 Where the Red Fern Grows (1974) - Sam Bellington
 The Florida Connection (1976) - Deke
 Creature from Black Lake (1976) - Sheriff Billy Carter
 Slumber Party '57 (1976) - Mr. Willis
 Charge of the Model T's (1977) - Sgt. Bond
 Close Encounters of the Third Kind (1977) - Air Traffic #2
 Keep My Grave Open (1977) - Hitchhiker
 The Beasts Are on the Streets (1978, TV Movie) - Carl Evans
 The Evictors (1979) - Preacher Higgins
 Tom Horn (1980) - Ora Haley
 Skyward (1980, TV Movie) - Pilot #1
 Raggedy Man (1981) - Sheriff
 Mountaintop Motel Massacre (1983) - Reverend Bill McWilley
 Places in the Heart (1984) - Homer
 Innocent Prey (1984) - Jim Gardner
 Alamo Bay (1985) - Sheriff
 Silverado (1985) - Carter
 Hawken's Breed (1987) - Jeb Kline
 It Takes Two (1988) - Bus Driver
 Painted Hero (1997) - Old Man Bolen (final film role)

References

External links 
 

1920 births
1995 deaths
American male film actors
20th-century American male actors
Male actors from Texas